Rajya Sabha elections were held in 2018 to elect the 65 retiring members of the Rajya Sabha, Indian Parliament's upper chamber. There were, as routine, three such elections held among relevant State and Union Territory legislators by single transferable vote (STV) and Open Ballot: on 16 January to elect 3 members from Delhi and 1 member from Sikkim; on 23 March to elect 58 members from 16 States; and lastly on 21 June to elect 3 members from Kerala.  Being even-numbered, 2018 was a year in which about 30% of the State Legislature-elected 233-seat component of the body is elected.  The other 12 seats of the body are appointed by the President.

Not as part of a six-yearly cycle, a by-election was held to elect 1 member from Kerala in March, which proved to be a re-election but as an independent member, of M. P. Veerendra Kumar, the only by-election of the year.

Elections
The elections were held to elect 3 members from National Capital Territory of Delhi and 1 member from Sikkim. 3 members from the National Capital Territory of Delhi retired on 27 January 2018 and 1 member from Sikkim retired on 23 February 2018. Elections for 58 seats and a by-election for 1 seat were held on 23 March 2018. The election was held for 3 seats of Kerala on 21 June 2018.

Members Elected

National Capital Territory of Delhi
Delhi had an election for 3 Rajya Sabha seats on 16 January 2018 to replace members retiring on 27 January 2018.

Sikkim
Sikkim had an election for 1 Rajya Sabha seat on 16 January 2018 to replace member retiring on 23 February 2018.

Andhra Pradesh
From Andhra Pradesh State, 3 members are elected unopposed for the Rajya Sabha seats on 15 March 2018, to replace members retiring on 2 April 2018.

Bihar
From Bihar State, 6 members are elected unopposed for the Rajya Sabha seats on 15 March 2018, to replace members retiring on 2 April 2018.

Chhattisgarh
From Chhattisgarh State, 1 member is elected for the Rajya Sabha seat on 23 March 2018, to replace member retiring on 2 April 2018.

Gujarat
From Gujarat State, 4 members are elected unopposed for the Rajya Sabha seats on 15 March 2018, to replace members retiring on 2 April 2018.

Haryana
From Haryana State, 1 member is elected unopposed for the Rajya Sabha seats on 15 March 2018, to replace member retiring on 2 April 2018.

Himachal Pradesh
From Himachal Pradesh State, 1 member is elected unopposed for the Rajya Sabha seats on 15 March 2018, to replace member retiring on 2 April 2018.

Jharkhand
From Jharkhand State, 2 members are elected for the Rajya Sabha seats on 23 March 2018, to replace members retiring on 3 May 2018.

Karnataka
From Karnataka State, 4 members are elected for the Rajya Sabha seats on 23 March 2018, to replace members retiring on 2 April 2018.

Madhya Pradesh
From Madhya Pradesh State, 5 members are elected unopposed for the Rajya Sabha seats on 15 March 2018, to replace members retiring on 2 April 2018.

Maharashtra
From Maharashtra State, 6 members are elected unopposed for the Rajya Sabha seats on 15 March 2018, to replace members retiring on 2 April 2018.

Odisha
From Odisha State, 3 members are elected unopposed for the Rajya Sabha seats on 15 March 2018, to replace members retiring on 3 April 2018.

Rajasthan
From Rajasthan State, 3 members are elected unopposed for the Rajya Sabha seats on 15 March 2018, to replace members retiring on 3 April 2018.

Telangana
From Telangana State, 3 members are elected for the Rajya Sabha seats on 23 March 2018, to replace members retiring on 2 April 2018.

Uttarakhand
From Uttarakhand State, 1 member is elected unopposed for the Rajya Sabha seats on 15 March 2018, to replace member retiring on 2 April 2018.

Uttar Pradesh
From Uttar Pradesh State, 10 members are elected for the Rajya Sabha seats on 23 March 2018, to replace members retiring on 2 April 2018.

West Bengal
From West Bengal State, 5 members are elected for the Rajya Sabha seats on 23 March 2018, to replace members retiring on 2 April 2018.

Kerala
From Kerala State, 3 members are elected unopposed for the Rajya Sabha seats on 14 June 2018, to replace members retiring on 1 July 2018.

Nominated

By-elections
In addition to scheduled elections, unforeseen vacancies, caused by members' resignation, death or disqualification, may also be filled via By-elections.
 On 2 September 2017, Manohar Parrikar resigned from membership of the Rajya Sabha from Uttar Pradesh, due to his election as the member of Goa Legislative Assembly on 23 August by-poll.

Uttar Pradesh

Kerala

 On 20 December 2017, M. P. Veerendra Kumar resigned from Rajya Sabha due to disqualification of Sharad Yadav.

References

2018 elections in India
2018